NGC 3837 is an elliptical galaxy located about 290 million light-years away in the constellation Leo. It was discovered by astronomer William Herschel on April 26, 1785. NGC 3837 is a member of the Leo Cluster.

See also
 List of NGC objects (3001–4000)
 NGC 3842

References

External links

3837
36476
6701
Leo (constellation)
Leo Cluster
Elliptical galaxies
Astronomical objects discovered in 1785